William Cullen Kittredge (February 23, 1800 – June 11, 1869) was a Vermont lawyer and politician.  He served as 18th lieutenant governor of Vermont from 1852 to 1853.

Early life
William Cullen Kittredge was born in Dalton, Massachusetts on February 23, 1800.  He graduated Phi Beta Kappa from Williams College in 1821, received a master's degree from Williams in 1824, studied law in Northampton, and practiced in Kentucky and Ohio before settling in Fair Haven, Vermont in 1824.

Business and political career
In addition to practicing law, Kittredge was involved in several business ventures, including serving as the first President of National Life Insurance Company and owning a partnership in a successful marble company.

Kittredge served for eight years in the Vermont House of Representatives, including two as Speaker.  He also served in the Vermont Senate and as Rutland County State's Attorney and Assistant Judge and Judge of the County Court.  Kittredge was the successful Whig nominee for Lieutenant Governor in 1852 and served from 1852 to 1853.

Death
After leaving office Kittredge continued to practice law in Fair Haven.  Kittredge died in Rutland, Vermont on June 11, 1869 while en route to Bennington to assume the post of U.S. Internal Revenue Assessor.  He was buried at West Street Cemetery in Fair Haven.

References 

1800 births
1869 deaths
Williams College alumni
Vermont lawyers
State's attorneys in Vermont
Vermont Whigs
19th-century American politicians
Speakers of the Vermont House of Representatives
Republican Party members of the Vermont House of Representatives
Vermont state senators
Lieutenant Governors of Vermont
People from Fair Haven, Vermont
Vermont state court judges
People from Dalton, Massachusetts
Burials in Vermont
19th-century American judges
19th-century American lawyers